Lustig is a surname, and may refer to:

 Aaron Lustig (born 1956), American film and television actor
 Alessandro Lustig (1857–1937), Austro-Italian pathologist
 Alvin Lustig (1915–1955), American designer
 Arnošt Lustig (1926–2011), Czech Jewish author
 Billy Lustig (died 1913), American gang leader
 Bob Lustig, General Manager of the Buffalo Bills
 Branko Lustig (1932–2019), Croatian film producer
 main character in the fairy tale Brother Lustig
 Eugenia Sacerdote de Lustig (1910–2011), Argentine physician
 Fritz Lustig (1919–2017), German-Jewish emigrant to England during the Nazi era)
 Jo Lustig (1925–1999), American music entrepreneur
 John Lustig (born 1953), American comics writer
 Mikael Lustig (born 1986), Swedish footballer
 Nora Lustig, Argentinian professor of Latin American economics
 Peter Lustig (1937–2016), German television presenter and author of children's books
 Robin Lustig (born 1948), British radio broadcaster
 Robert H. Lustig, American professor of clinical pediatrics, expert on obesity and sugar
 Victor Lustig (1890–1947), Czech-born con artist
 William Lustig (born 1955), also known as Bill Lustig, American film director and producer

See also
 Lustick